Hardyal Singh (28 November 1928 – 17 August 2018) was an Indian hockey player who lived in the state of Uttarakhand. He was part of the Indian hockey team that won the gold medal in 1956 Summer Olympics at Melbourne. He died on 17 August 2018.

References

External links

1928 births
2018 deaths
People from Lucknow district
Field hockey players from Uttar Pradesh
Olympic field hockey players of India
Olympic gold medalists for India
Field hockey players at the 1956 Summer Olympics
Indian male field hockey players
Olympic medalists in field hockey
Medalists at the 1956 Summer Olympics
Recipients of the Dhyan Chand Award